Haplophylax is a genus of moth in the family Cosmopterigidae. It contains only one species, Haplophylax paraphanes, which is found in India.

References

External links
Natural History Museum Lepidoptera genus database

Cosmopterigidae
Monotypic moth genera